Abdumalik Bahori (22 March 1927 Leninabad, USSR - 3 December 2010, Dushanbe, Tajikistan) was a children's poet and the first Tajikistani fiction writer. He was born into a middle-class family who worked in the silk producing industry. He graduated from Leninabad Pedagogical Institute (now known as Khujand State University) in 1946.

Bahori was a writer who predicted cell phones and the possible cloning of humans.

Dili beqaror - Дили беқарор 1962
Qarzi juragi - Қарзи ҷӯрагӣ
Ajoiboit Nodar - Аҷоиботи Нодар 1972
Sunbula - Сунбула 1974
For his great contribution to the development of Tajik literature, he was awarded the title of "People's Writer of Tajikistan" and was a laureate of the State Prize of Tajikistan named after A. Rudaki. He was awarded the Order of the Badge of Honor (April 24, 1957).

References 

20th-century Tajikistani poets
Tajikistani male writers
Tajikistani writers
1927 births
2010 deaths
Persian-language poets
Tajikistani novelists
Tajik poets
21st-century Tajikistani poets
20th-century novelists